As Was (also styled AsWas) is an EP by Manfred Mann (shown as Manfred Mann with Paul Jones), released in 1966. The EP is a 7-inch vinyl record and released in mono with the catalogue number His Master's Voice-EMI 7EG 8962.

At the time the EP was released, Paul Jones had already left the band and the new Manfred Mann line-up with Mike D'Abo concurrently released their first album As Is on Fontana.

Track listing

Side 1

 "I Can't Believe What You Say" (Ike Turner)
 "That's All I Ever Want From You Baby" (Ellie Greenwich, Jeff Barry)

Side 2

 "Driva Man" (Max Roach, Oscar Brown Jr.)
 "It's Getting Late" (Mann, Hugg, Jones, McGuinness)

Personnel

 Manfred Mann – keyboards
 Mike Hugg - drums and vibes
 Paul Jones – vocals, harmonica, maracas

 Henry Lowther - trumpet and flute (all tracks except "I Can't Believe What You Say")
 Lyn Dobson - saxophone (all tracks except "I Can't Believe What You Say")
 Tom McGuinness - guitar  (all tracks except "I Can't Believe What You Say"), bass guitar  ("I Can't Believe What You Say")
 Jack Bruce - bass guitar  (all tracks except "I Can't Believe What You Say")
 Mike Vickers - guitar (only on "I Can't Believe What You Say")

Chart performance

This EP reached No. 4 in the British EP charts.

References
Footnotes

1966 EPs
EMI Records EPs
Manfred Mann EPs
His Master's Voice EPs